Nordic combined at the 2016 Winter Youth Olympics was held at the Lysgårdsbakken in Lillehammer, Norway on 16 February. Nordic combined athletes also took part at the mixed ski jumping team event and the nordic team event.

Medal summary

Medal table

Events

Boys' events

Mixed events

Qualification system
Each nation could send a maximum of 1 boy. The top scoring teams of the Marc Hodler Trophy Ski Jumping at the 2015 Junior Nordic World Ski Championships plus the hosts Norway were allowed to send the maximum of 1 boy. Any remaining quota spots were distributed to nations not already qualified, with a maximum of one boy or girl from one nation. The quota limit was 20.

Qualification summary

References

External links
Results Book – Nordic combined

 
2016 in Nordic combined
2016 Winter Youth Olympics events
2016
Youth Olympics